The UCI Track Cycling World Championships – Men's team pursuit is the team pursuit competition for men held annually at the UCI Track Cycling World Championships. Since its introduction as an elite event at the 1993 championships, Australia have won the gold medal the most with thirteen victories. Before 1993, the event was held for amateur teams.

Medalists

Medal table

External links
Track Cycling World Championships 2016–1893 bikecult.com
World Championship, Track, Team pursuit, Elite cyclingarchives.com

 
Men's team pursuit
Lists of UCI Track Cycling World Championships medalists